Tellus Science Museum is a natural history and science museum near Cartersville, Georgia with a facility of over 120,000 square feet. It is an affiliate of the Smithsonian Institution. The museum is open daily from 10:00 AM to 5:00 PM closing only on major holidays, and entrance fees vary. The museum also has multiple special events scheduled throughout the year, many revolving around the Bentley Planetarium and observatory facility. The largest displays consist of a very large fossil exhibit and mineral gallery.

Facility contents 
 Weinman Mineral Gallery
 Fossil Gallery with well-detailed casts of Mesozoic land and marine creatures
 Millar Science in Motion Gallery exhibiting past and modern transportation displays
 Collins Family My Big Backyard exhibiting hands on experiments with light, sound, magnetism and electricity.
 Bentley Planetarium
 Observatory with a 20-inch Planewave reflecting telescope and a Coronado solar scope
 Theater
 Banquet Halls
 The Vault sub gallery featuring local mineral, paleontological and archeological treasures
 The Crossroads Gallery featuring recent to modern marvels
 West Virginia University Solar House built by university students for the 2015 U.S. Department of Energy Solar Decathlon

History

Tellus was founded as the Weinman Mineral Museum in 1983, which closed in 2007 and reopened as Tellus Science Museum in 2009. The museum retains the original mineral displays in the Weinman Mineral Gallery.

References

External links

 Museum homepage

Science museums in Georgia (U.S. state)
Smithsonian Institution affiliates
Museums in Bartow County, Georgia
Geology museums in the United States
Natural history museums in Georgia (U.S. state)
Dinosaur museums in the United States
Paleontology in Georgia (U.S. state)